Timo Simonlatser (born May 17, 1986) is an Estonian cross-country skier who has competed since 2005. He finished 27th in the individual sprint at the 2010 Winter Olympics in Vancouver.

Simonlatser's best finish at the FIS Nordic World Ski Championships was 24th in the individual sprint event at Sapporo in 2007.

His best World Cup finish was seventh in a team sprint event at Russia in January 2010 while his best individual finish was 12th three times since 2008.

External links

1986 births
Olympic cross-country skiers of Estonia
Estonian male cross-country skiers
Living people
Cross-country skiers at the 2010 Winter Olympics
21st-century Estonian people